Landwijk Castle is a castle in the municipality of Herk-de-Stad, Belgium.

See also
List of castles in Belgium

External links
Castle Landwijk photos

Castles in Belgium
Castles in Limburg (Belgium)